Jasur Matchanov (born March 15, 1984) is an Uzbek amateur boxer from Tashkent who medaled repeatedly at 201 lbs in international tournaments.

Career
2004 he boxed at super heavyweight at the military world championships winning bronze after losing to Steffen Kretschmann.

2005 at the world championships he fought at 201 lbs where he bested Jose Julio Payares and Clemente Russo, but lost 19:25 to Elchin Alizade and won bronze.

He won silver at the Military World Championships 2006 when he beat Hamsat Gilishanov from Kazachstan but lost the final to hard-hitting Russian favorite Rakhim Chakhkeiv 4:21.

At the 2006 Asian Games he lost the final to Iranian Ali Mazaheri 19:25 .

At the 2007 World Championships he was upset early by Moldavian Michael Muntyan , he didn't compete in the 2009 World Championships.

In 2009 he ended his career in amateur boxing.

At the moment he is studying in MPA of the APA (Academy of Public Administration) of Uzbekistan, has a family, a son and a daughter.

External links 
2005 World Championships

Living people
1984 births
Sportspeople from Tashkent
Asian Games medalists in boxing
Boxers at the 2006 Asian Games
Uzbekistani male boxers
AIBA World Boxing Championships medalists
Asian Games silver medalists for Uzbekistan
Medalists at the 2006 Asian Games
Heavyweight boxers
21st-century Uzbekistani people